Roger De Breuker (Grobbendonk, 13 July 1940) was a Belgian professional road bicycle racer. De Breuker's only Tour de France that he participated in was the 1963 Tour de France, where he won 2 stages.

Major results

1961
Tour of Belgium (for amateurs, Grand Prix of Hempstead
1962
Edegem, one Stage in Peace-Race, 4. in Final Classement 
1963
Tour de France:
Winner stages 6A and 20

External links 

Official Tour de France results for Roger De Breuker

Belgian male cyclists
1940 births
Living people
Belgian Tour de France stage winners
Cyclists from Antwerp Province
People from Grobbendonk